Navanethem "Navi" Pillay (born 23 September 1941) is a South African jurist who served as the United Nations High Commissioner for Human Rights from 2008 to 2014. A South African of Indian Tamil origin, she was the first non-white woman judge of the High Court of South Africa, and she has also served as a judge of the International Criminal Court and President of the International Criminal Tribunal for Rwanda. Her four-year term as High Commissioner for Human Rights began on 1 September 2008 and was extended an additional two years in 2012. She was succeeded in September 2014 by Prince Zeid bin Ra'ad. In April 2015 Pillay became the 16th Commissioner of the International Commission Against the Death Penalty. She is also one of the 25 leading figures on the Information and Democracy Commission launched by Reporters Without Borders.

Background
Pillay was born in 1941 in a poor neighborhood of Durban, Natal Province, Union of South Africa.  She is of Indian Tamil descent and her father was a bus driver.  She married Gaby Pillay, a lawyer, in January 1965. She has two daughters.

Supported by her local Indian community with donations, she graduated from the University of Natal with a BA in 1963 and an LLB in 1965. She later attended Harvard Law School, obtaining an LLM in 1982 and a Doctor of Juridical Science degree in 1988. Pillay is the first South African to obtain a doctorate in law from Harvard Law School.

Legal career
In 1967, Pillay became the first non-white woman to open her own law practice in Natal Province.  She says she had no other alternative: "No law firm would employ me because they said they could not have white employees taking instructions from a coloured person".  As a non-white lawyer under the Apartheid regime, she was not allowed to enter a judge's chambers.

During her 28 years as a lawyer in South Africa, she defended anti-Apartheid activists and helped expose the use of torture and poor conditions of political detainees.  When her husband was detained under the Apartheid laws, she successfully sued to prevent the police from using unlawful methods of interrogation against him.  In 1973, she won the right for political prisoners on Robben Island, including Nelson Mandela, to have access to lawyers.  She co-founded the Advice Desk for the Abused and ran a shelter for victims of domestic violence. As a member of the Women’s National Coalition, she contributed to the inclusion in South Africa’s Constitution of an equality clause prohibiting discrimination on the grounds of race, religion and sexual orientation. In 1992, she co-founded the international women's rights group Equality Now.

In 1995, the year after the African National Congress came to power, Mandela nominated Pillay as the first non-white woman to serve on the High Court of South Africa.  She noted that "the first time I entered a judge's chambers was when I entered my own."

Her tenure on the High Court was short, however, as she was soon elected by the United Nations General Assembly to serve as a judge at the International Criminal Tribunal for Rwanda (ICTR).  She served for eight years, including four years as president.  She was the only female judge for the first four years of the tribunal.  Her tenure on the ICTR is best remembered for her role in the landmark trial of Jean-Paul Akayesu, which established that rape and sexual assault could constitute acts of genocide.  Pillay said in an interview, "From time immemorial, rape has been regarded as spoils of war. Now it will be considered a war crime. We want to send out a strong signal that rape is no longer a trophy of war."

In February 2003, she was elected to the first ever panel of judges of the International Criminal Court and assigned to the Appeals Division.  She was elected to a six-year term, but resigned in August 2008 in order to take up her position with the UN.

High Commissioner for Human Rights
On 24 July 2008, UN Secretary-General Ban Ki-moon nominated Pillay to succeed Louise Arbour as High Commissioner for Human Rights.  The United States reportedly resisted her appointment at first, because of her views on abortion and other issues, but eventually dropped its opposition.  At a special meeting on 28 July 2008, the UN General Assembly confirmed the nomination by consensus.  Her four-year term began on 1 September 2008.  Pillay says the High Commissioner is "the voice of the victim everywhere." In 2012, she was given a two-year second term. She also signed a document "BORN FREE AND EQUAL", a document on sexual orientation and gender identity in international human rights law as High Commissioner.

Pillay voiced support for a gay rights resolution in the UNHRC, which was approved in 2011. At a news conference in July 2014, she referred to Edward Snowden as a "human rights defender" and said, "I am raising right here some very important arguments that could be raised on his behalf so that these criminal proceedings are averted." In August 2014, she criticized the international community over its "paralysis" in dealing with the more than three-year old Syrian Civil War, which by 30 April 2014 had resulted in 191,369 deaths.

Awards
In 2003, Pillay received the inaugural Gruber Prize for Women’s Rights.

She has been awarded honorary degrees by
 Durban University of Technology - the University based in her hometown of Durban, South Africa,
 Durham University,
 the City University of New York School of Law,
 the London School of Economics, Rhodes University,
 the University of Leuven,
 the Erasmus University Rotterdam.

In 2009, Forbes ranked her as the 64th most powerful woman in the world.

In 2009, she received the Golden Plate Award of the American Academy of Achievement presented by Awards Council member Archbishop Desmond Tutu at an awards ceremony at St. George’s Cathedral in Cape Town, South Africa.

Controversies
Her criticism of the Sri Lankan government, in alleging human rights violations and atrocities committed by them against Tamil civilians at the end of the Sri Lankan civil war, has led the government and its supporters to apportion her own Tamil descent as the only reason for her criticism, a claim she strongly denies.

In a speech on 8 June 2012, Pillay blacklisted the provincial government of Quebec in Canada for human rights violations concerning the rights to peaceful protest and free expression for its student protesters, specifically in Canada. The reaction from human rights NGOs was mixed. Quebec official sources criticised Pillay for comparing Quebec with areas known to have worse records.

Pillay's call in 2012 for the suspension of sanctions against the Mugabe regime in Zimbabwe was criticised by Zimbabwean civil society groups who accused the Zimbabwean government of manipulating Pillay to overlook the human rights violations committed by the government.

Her contribution to the 2001 Durban Conference on racism, the Goldstone report, and her steering of the UN Human Rights Council have been criticized as unjust by The Jerusalem Post. Pillay criticized that Israel was engaged in the killing of playing children as eye witnessed by Peter Beaumont and several other journalists at Gaza on 16 July 2014 - and later proven by an internal IDF investigation. 

After reviewing heavy US contribution to the Iron Dome program, her call for better defence for Gaza, "No such protection has been provided to Gazans against the shelling" has been described by one critic in Tablet magazine as a "hilariously delicious absurdity". On 25 July 2014, the United States Congress published a letter addressed to Pillay by over 100 members in which the signatories asserted that the Human Rights Council "cannot be taken seriously as a human rights organisation" over their handling of the 2014 Israel–Gaza conflict.

In July 2022 Pillay defended Miloon Kothari, a member of the Permanent United Nations Fact Finding Mission on the Israel Palestine conflict who questioned Israel's right to be a UN member state and alluded to a "Jewish lobby controlling social media," which prompted condemnation by Israel, Britain and United States. Pillay claimed that Kothari's comments were taken out of context.

See also 
 First women lawyers around the world

References 

People from Durban
South African people of Tamil descent
South African people of Indian descent
International Criminal Court judges
South African women's rights activists
Harvard Law School alumni
Presidents of the International Criminal Tribunal for Rwanda
United Nations High Commissioners for Human Rights
1941 births
Living people
South African women judges
Under-Secretaries-General of the United Nations
South African judges of United Nations courts and tribunals
South African judges of international courts and tribunals
Commanders Crosses of the Order of Merit of the Federal Republic of Germany